Sveti Duh (literally, 'Holy Spirit') may refer to several places in Slovenia:

Podolševa, a settlement in the Municipality of Solčava, known as Sveti Duh until 1953
Sveti Duh, Bloke, a settlement in the Municipality of Bloke
Sveti Duh, Dravograd, a settlement in the Municipality of Dravograd
Sveti Duh na Ostrem Vrhu, a settlement in the Municipality of Selnica ob Dravi
Sveti Duh, Škofja Loka, a settlement in the Municipality of Škofja Loka